Fractured is a 2019 American psychological thriller film directed by Brad Anderson from a screenplay by Alan B. McElroy. It stars Sam Worthington, Lily Rabe, Stephen Tobolowsky, Adjoa Andoh, and Lucy Capri.

The film had its world premiere at Fantastic Fest on September 22, 2019. It was released on October 11, 2019, by Netflix.

Plot
Ray Monroe is driving home with his wife Joanne and his daughter Peri after a Thanksgiving visit to Joanne's parents. Ray and Joanne argue about the state of their relationship. In the car, Peri's music device stops working due to dead batteries and Ray tells her he will buy some for her at the next gas station. Soon, Peri says she needs to use a restroom and so they take a break at a gas station. The cashier tells Ray that they only take cash so Ray skips the batteries, but, in addition to a coke for Joanne and a coffee for himself, buys two small bottles of liquor. After returning to the car, he lies to Joanne saying the store didn't have batteries. Peri cannot find her compact mirror so Joanne goes to check the restroom and Ray searches the back seat. While Ray is distracted, Peri starts to wander towards a deserted construction site because of a balloon stuck on a rebar. She is menaced by a stray dog and starts backing toward an exposed pit. Ray throws a rock to scare the dog but it causes Peri to fall into the hole. Ray, aiming to grab her, falls in as well and hits his head. He comes around in a daze and to a distressed Joanne who has climbed down and is checking Peri for injuries. After his head clears, he picks Peri up and decides to have her injured arm seen at a hospital they passed a few miles back.

During the admissions process, the couple is asked if they would be willing for Peri to be placed on the organ donor register, which they decline. Peri is seen by a doctor who states that her arm is fractured and that he wants her to have a CAT scan in case she has a head injury. Joanne accompanies her to the scanning facility in the basement, while Ray falls asleep in the waiting area.

Ray awakens hours later and asks the hospital staff if he can see his wife and daughter, but is told they have no record of them. Most of the doctors have changed shifts, and the only nurse still there says that Ray came alone and was treated for a head wound. Ray becomes distressed, is restrained by security and, after being given a sedative, is locked in a room. He escapes and waves down two police officers, who agree to investigate.

Further evidence is found that Ray's family never was at the hospital. He is taken to the gas station by the police and a hospital psychiatrist. It is also found that Ray was a recovering alcoholic and eight years ago, caused a car crash where his first wife, Abby, died with their unborn child. They find a large bloodstain in the pit and attempt to arrest Ray on suspicion of him murdering his wife and daughter. He takes an officer's gun and locks everyone in the gas station before returning to the hospital. He reaches the basement, after strangling a security guard to death, and finds that Peri is about to have her organs harvested. He drags her out of the operating theatre, along with a drugged Joanne, shooting a doctor as they leave. As they drive away, it is revealed that his family died in the pit; Peri from her fall and Joanne after Ray pushed her and her skull landed on a protruding piece of rebar. Their bodies have been in the trunk of the car the whole time, and the events of the hospital visit resulted from Ray's psyche trying to deny the reality of what had happened. In the back seat, a seriously ill patient who Ray extracted from surgery lies unconscious.

Cast

Production
In November 2018, Sam Worthington signed to star, with Brad Anderson attached to direct Alan B. McElroy's script, Paul Schiff, Neal Edelstein, and Mike Macari producing, and Netflix distributing. In December 2018, Lily Rabe, Stephen Tobolowsky, Adjoa Andoh, and Lucy Capri joined the cast. Production began that month. Principal photography for the film took place on location in Winnipeg, Manitoba, Canada from November 2018 to January 2019.

Release
The film had its world premiere at Fantastic Fest on September 22, 2019. It was released on Netflix on October 11, 2019.

Reception

References

External links
 
 

2019 films
2019 psychological thriller films
2010s American films
2010s English-language films
American psychological thriller films
English-language Netflix original films
Films about missing people
Films directed by Brad Anderson
Films scored by Anton Sanko
Films set in hospitals
Films shot in Winnipeg
Uxoricide in fiction